Otsego is an unincorporated community in Muskingum County, in the U.S. state of Ohio.

History
Otsego was laid out in 1838, and named after Otsego, New York. A post office was established at Otsego in 1840, and discontinued in 1963. It lies at the intersection of Route 93 and Route 83

References

Unincorporated communities in Muskingum County, Ohio
1838 establishments in Ohio
Populated places established in 1838
Unincorporated communities in Ohio